The Johore Battery was a former British coastal artillery battery located in Changi on the easternmost side of mainland Singapore. It consisted of three large BL 15-inch Mk. I naval guns installed on land by the British government in the late 1930s to defend the approaching path to the east of the island to their large naval base located at Sembawang in the north (accessed via the Johor Straits) from an attacking enemy naval force.

History 
Five massive 15–inch naval guns were installed in Singapore by the British government before 1940, with three based in Changi to the east and two located in Buona Vista to the southwest. Collectively, the three naval guns in Changi formed the Johore Battery, named after the King of Johor, Sultan Ibrahim, who gave King George V of the UK a grand royal gift of £500,000 for his Silver Jubilee in 1935, of which £400,000 of the amount was used by the British government to fund the installation of the three large naval guns in Changi. In early 1942, the Johore Battery was employed in the Allied artillery bombardment of Johor Bahru, which at that time was under Japanese military occupation following the retreat of all Allied forces from British Malaya to Singapore.

Built by the British government in 1939 for the naval defence of Singapore (in particular, to defend Singapore from an aggressive Imperial Japan, which had possessed a strong and a powerful navy by the later part of the 1930s and was expanding deeper and deeper into China), the Johore Battery is a large gun emplacement site consisting of a labyrinth of tunnels. These tunnels were used to store quantities of ammunition for the three 15-inch guns (most of which were of the armour-piercing (AP) type rather than the high-explosive (HE) type as these naval guns were intended to be employed against heavily armoured enemy warships).

These naval guns were the largest to be installed on land outside of Britain itself during World War II. They were all destroyed before the official surrender of the British Army on 15 February 1942 to the conquering Imperial Japanese military and the related tunnels (for the storage of the ammunition for the guns and gun-crew quarters) were sealed up and almost forgotten after the war in 1945.

In 1948 one of the guns was demolished and returned to England as scrap. In 1950 the Royal Army Ordnance Corps began an exercise to remove live gun shells that were buried at Changi during the British evacuation in 1942.

The location remained unknown until the Singapore Prisons Service discovered them by chance in April 1991.

Conservation 
The former site of the Johore battery now includes a replica of the large naval gun and a dummy 15-inch shell, placed upon a modern large lifting-lever; allowing visitors to have a feel of its 800kg weight by trying to hoist it up from the ground. The old, and still inaccessible, tunnels are marked out in a maze of above ground trails. A plaque detailing the history of the battery is present at the hut forming the entrance to the site.

Admission to the site of the battery is free with opening hours 09:00 to 17:00 Monday to Friday. The compound also includes a restaurant. .

See also 
 Singapore strategy

References

Further reading 
 Chung, Ong Chit (2011). Operation Matador: World War II—Britain’s Attempt to Foil the Japanese Invasion of Malaya and Singapore. Marshall Cavendish International Asia Pte Ltd.
 Blackburn, Kevin and Hack, Karl (2003). Did Singapore Have to Fall?: Churchill and the Impregnable Fortress. Routledge.

External links 
Places to go in Singapore – Johore Battery
Heritage trails – Johore Battery
Sample of images, in Google
 Johore Battery, history and images - Fort Siloso website  (accessed 2017-05-03)
 15 in gun from Johore Battery, details and images - Fort Siloso website  (accessed 2017-05-03)
 The Guns of Singapore - Naval Historical Society of Australia website  (accessed 2017-05-05)

380 mm artillery
Buildings and structures demolished in 1942
Coastal artillery
Coastal fortifications
Forts in Singapore
Military and war museums in Singapore
Military of Singapore under British rule
World War II museums
World War II naval weapons
World War II sites in Singapore
Artillery batteries